Bark may refer to:

 Bark (botany), an outer layer of a woody plant such as a tree or stick
 Bark (sound), a vocalization of some animals (which is commonly the dog)

Places
 Bark, Germany
 Bark, Warmian-Masurian Voivodeship, Poland

Arts, entertainment, and media
 Bark (Jefferson Airplane album), 1971
Bark (Blackie and the Rodeo Kings album)
 Bark (short story collection), a short story collection by Lorrie Moore
 Bark!, a 2002 film
 Bark!, a magazine published by Canada Wide Media
 Bark the Polar Bear, a character in the Sonic the Hedgehog series

Brands and enterprises
 BARK (computer), a computer

Food
 Almond bark, a confection 
 Peppermint bark, a confection

Science
 βARK, Beta adrenergic receptor kinase, an intracellular enzyme
 Bark scale, an auditory frequency metric

Other uses
 Bark or barque, a type of sailing ship
 BARK (organization), an environmentalist organization in the U.S. state of Oregon

See also
 Barkeria, an orchid genus